Veleropilina is a living genus of monoplacophoran, once described as a limpet, and is known from fossil deposits.

Species
 Veleropilina brummeri (Goud & Gittenberger, 1993)
 Veleropilina capulus (B. A. Marshall, 2006)
 Veleropilina euglypta (Dautzenberg & H. Fischer, 1897)
 Veleropilina goesi (Warén, 1988)
 Veleropilina oligotropha (Rokop, 1972)
 Veleropilina reticulata (Seguenza, 1876)
 Veleropilina segonzaci (Warén & Bouchet, 2001)
 Veleropilina seisuimaruae Kano, S. Kimura, T. Kimura & Warén, 2012
 Veleropilina veleronis (Menzies & Layton, 1963)
 Veleropilina zografi (Dautzenberg & H. Fischer, 1896)

References

Monoplacophora
Mollusc genera